Alberta Provincial Highway No. 570 is a highway in the province of Alberta, Canada. Highway 570 continues east in Saskatchewan as an unnumbered highway for  before ending at Saskatchewan Highway 44.

Highway 570 is considered part of the shortest route between Calgary and Saskatoon, with some digital map platforms recommending using it along with Highway 564 and Highway 848 through Alberta, as opposed Highway 9 which is part of Canada's National Highway System.

Major intersections

References 

570
Drumheller